Lychnothamnus is a genus of stoneworts belonging to the family Characeae.

The species of this genus are found in Europe, Australia and Northern America.

Species:
 Lychnothamnus barbatus (L.Meyen) Leonh., 1863

References

Charophyta
Charophyta genera